Ilse Kappelle (born 13 May 1998) is a field hockey player from the Netherlands, who plays as a defender and midfielder.

Personal life
Ilse Kappelle was born in Amstelveen and raised in Nijmegen, Netherlands.

Career

Club hockey
In the Dutch Hoofdklasse, Kappelle plays club hockey for Amsterdam.

National teams

Under–21
Kappelle made her debut for the Netherlands U–21 side in 2016 at the Junior World Cup in Santiago, Chile. At the tournament, Kappelle scored two goals, and helped the team to a silver medal finish, losing in the final to Argentina.

In 2019, Kappelle made her second and final appearance for the Under–21 team at the EuroHockey Junior Championship in Valencia, Spain. Kappelle was captain of the team, which finished second after losing the final in a penalty shoot-out against Spain.

Oranje Dames
In 2019, Kappelle was named in the Netherlands senior squad for the first time, and is set to make her debut in 2020.

References

External links
 
 

1998 births
Living people
Female field hockey midfielders
Female field hockey defenders
Sportspeople from Nijmegen
Amsterdamsche Hockey & Bandy Club players